Kënga Magjike 2018 was the 20th edition of the annual Albanian music contest Kënga Magjike and was held between 5 December 2018 and 8 December 2018 at the Pallati i Kongreseve in Tirana. The three live shows were hosted by Ardit Gjebrea, Klaudia Pepa and Bora Zemani.

The winner of the contest was Flori Mumajesi with the song titled "Plas". This was his first victory in the contest as a singer though he was additionally the songwriter of the winning entries "Hape Vetën" by Aurela Gaçe in 2007 and "Ma Zgjat Dorën" by Eneda Tarifa in the following 2019 edition.

Format 

Kënga Magjike 2018, organised by Televizioni Klan (TV Klan), was the twentieth consecutive edition of the annual contest. The two semi-finals and grand final were held at the Pallati i Kongreseve in Tirana on 5, 6 and 8 December 2018 respectively.

Final 
 
The grand final took place on the 8th of December 2018 at the Pallati i Kongreseve in Tirana.

Key:
 Winner
 Second place
 Third place

References 

2018
2018 song contests
December 2018 events in Europe
2018 in Albanian music